These are the international rankings of Guatemala

International rankings

References

Guatemala